Kálmán Tóth may refer to:

 Kálmán Tóth (poet) (1831–1881), Hungarian poet
 Kálmán Tóth (footballer) (born 1944), Hungarian footballer